Sayn was a small German county of the Holy Roman Empire which, during the Middle Ages, existed within what is today Rheinland-Pfalz in Germany.

Sayn may also refer to: 

 Sayn, village in the borough of Bendorf in the county of Mayen-Koblenz, Rhineland-Palatinate, Germany
 Sayn Castle in Sayn
 Sayn (river), a right tributary of the River Rhine
 Sayn-Wittgenstein, German noble family
 Sayn-Wittgenstein-Sayn, branch of the German noble family